Ange N'Silu (born February 17, 1986) is a Congolese footballer who currently plays for Lancy FC.

Career

Europe
N'Silu was born in Zaire (now the Democratic Republic of the Congo), but was raised in Paris, France. He signed with Le Havre of the French Ligue 1 at the age of 15, and spent time with the club's academy and reserve squad, but did not play with the first team.

In 2008, N'Silu signed with Lausanne-based Swiss side FC Le Mont of the 1.Liga, and played in 31 games, scoring 25 goals.

North America
N'Silu signed for D.C. United on February 24, 2009, after impressing United's general manager, Dave Kasper, during a pre-season trial. He made his United debut against Houston Dynamo on April 4, 2009. N'Silu was released by D.C. United in January 2010.

References

External links
 MLS player profile

1986 births
Living people
Democratic Republic of the Congo footballers
Le Havre AC players
D.C. United players
Expatriate soccer players in the United States
Major League Soccer players
Association football forwards
21st-century Democratic Republic of the Congo people